Richard Howard Battey (October 16, 1929 – May 6, 2017) was a United States district judge of the United States District Court for the District of South Dakota.

Education and career

Battey was born in Aberdeen, South Dakota. After attending the University of South Dakota in 1950, he received a Juris Doctor from the University of South Dakota School of Law in 1953. After serving as a United States Army Lieutenant from 1953 to 1955, he went into private practice in Redfield, South Dakota from 1955 to 1985.

Federal judicial service

Battey was nominated to be a United States District Judge of the United States District Court for the District of South Dakota by Ronald Reagan on September 27, 1985. He was confirmed by the United States Senate on October 25, 1985, and received his commission on October 28, 1985. He served as Chief Judge from 1994 to 1998. He assumed senior status on January 1, 1999, serving in that status until his death.

'Sue' dinosaur fossil dispute
Battey is known for being the presiding judge in the dispute over the recovery fossil remains on Federal lands including by the Sue discoverer Peter Larson and Black Hills Institute of Geological Research paleontologists. Following  a trial on charges unrelated to the "Sue" T. rex find, Larson was convicted of two felonies and two misdemeanors, charges which some considered politically motivated. Battey sentenced Larson to two years in federal prison. In 2015, South Dakota lawmakers have petitioned Barack Obama for a formal full pardon of Larson. Battey is portrayed in a negative light for his handling of Sue Dinosaur Case in the Sundance Film Festival Documentary Dinosaur 13.

Notable law clerks

Among Battey's notable judicial law clerks were David Lust and Marty Jackley.

Death

Richard Battey died in Alexandria, Minnesota on May 6, 2017.

References

Sources
 

1929 births
2017 deaths
University of South Dakota alumni
Judges of the United States District Court for the District of South Dakota
United States district court judges appointed by Ronald Reagan
20th-century American judges
United States Army officers
People from Aberdeen, South Dakota
People from Redfield, South Dakota
People from Alexandria, Minnesota
University of South Dakota School of Law alumni